The 1925 Argentine Primera División was the 34th season of top-flight football in Argentina. The AFA season began on April 5 and ended in 1926; while the AAmF began on April 5 and ended on October 25.

Huracán won its 3rd. Asociación Argentina de Football (AFA) championship while Racing won the dissident league AAm championship, being the 9th. title for the club.

Asociación Argentina de Football - Copa Campeonato 

Sportivo del Norte changed its name to "Club Atlético Colegiales" and Platense II to "Retiro" (and later to "Universal") while Villa Urquiza changed to "General San Martín".

Championship playoff

Match details

Top scorers

Asociación Amateurs de Football

Top scorers

Notes

References

Argentine Primera División seasons
p
1925 in Argentine football
1925 in South American football